Richard de Beaumis may refer to:

 Richard de Beaumis (died 1127), medieval Bishop of London
 Richard de Beaumis (died 1162), medieval Bishop of London